Torsten Reuter (born 15 September 1982 in Kaiserslautern) is a German footballer who appeared in the Bundesliga for 1. FC Kaiserslautern.

Career
Reuter made his professional league debut in the Bundesliga for 1. FC Kaiserslautern on 10 August 2002, when he started a game against VfB Stuttgart.

Honours
 DFB-Pokal finalist: 2002–03

References

1982 births
Living people
German footballers
Germany youth international footballers
1. FC Kaiserslautern players
1. FC Kaiserslautern II players
1. FC Saarbrücken players
SV Wehen Wiesbaden players
Bundesliga players
2. Bundesliga players
Association football midfielders